The 1913 European Figure Skating Championships were held on February 1 to 2 in Kristiania, Norway. Elite figure skaters competed for the title of European Champion in the category of men's singles.

Results

Men

Judges:
 A. Anderberg 
 Yngvar Bryn 
 E. Hörle 
 Eugen Minich  (Hungary)
 O. Sampe

References

Sources
 Result List provided by the ISU

European Figure Skating Championships, 1913
European Figure Skating Championships
International sports competitions in Oslo
1913 in Norwegian sport
1910s in Oslo
February 1913 events
International figure skating competitions hosted by Norway